Peter Richter de Rangenier, also Peter Richter, (25 March 1930 – 9 August 2021) was an Austrian composer, conductor and University teacher.

Life 
Born in Prague, after attending the Gymnasium in Lübeck, Richter de Rangenier first worked as a freelance composer and founded the Lübecker Kammerorchester. He then studied composition, conducting, piano, horn and organ at the conservatories in Hochschule für Musik Detmold, Hochschule für Musik und Theater Hamburg and the Mozarteum.

He worked as a Kapellmeister in Hagen in 1954, in Wuppertal in 1957 and was musical director of the Theater des Westens in Berlin from 1960 to 1965 and from 1974 to 1976. From 1967 to 1973, Richter de Rangenier worked in Hof, Bavaria, as general music director (Hofer Symphoniker and Theater Hof). In 1977, he went to South America. Until 1981, he trained conductors as a professor at the University of Chile and also worked there as a conductor from 1979 to 1981.

In 1981 he returned to Europe and taught at the University of Music and Performing Arts Vienna. Concert tours took Richter de Rangenier to Switzerland (Lucerne Festival) and Germany. In 1989, he acted as guest conductor with the Vienna Symphony.

Work 
 1967: Sinfonietta
 1974: Die Raben von Holland. Opera after Maurice Maeterlinck
 1982: Und Pippa tanzt! Opera after Gerhart Hauptmann
Furthermore: Symphonies, string quartets, various pieces for different solo instruments, choral works and Lieder.

Honours and prizes 
 1960: Kunstpreis des Landes Nordrhein-Westfalen
 1961: Förderpreis der Hansestadt Lübeck
 1980: Ehrenmitglied der Philharmonie Santiago de Chile (Orquesta Filarmónica de Santiago)
 1982: Theodor Körner Prize

References

External links 
 
 
 

1930 births
2021 deaths
Austrian composers
Austrian conductors (music)
Academic staff of the University of Music and Performing Arts Vienna
Academic staff of the University of Chile
Musicians from Prague